Alfons Hörmann (born 6 September 1960) is a German businessman and sports official. Since 7 December 2013, he has been the President of the Deutscher Olympischer Sportbund. He had previously served as president of the German Ski Association from 2005 to 2013.

Business career
Hörmann began his career in the building materials fabrication industry in 1977. From 1990 to 1998, he was the director of the marketing and sales department at the German company . He became its CEO in 1998 and remained in that position until 2010.

Sports officialdom
In 2010, Hörmann joined the Council of the International Ski Federation. He was elected as president of the Bavarian Ski Association in 2002, German Ski Association in 2005, and then of the German Olympic Sports Confederation (DOSB) in 2013 to replace Thomas Bach. Hörmann's election to the presidency of the DOSB led to the owner of Hörmann Industries, Hans Hörmann, firing Alfons and Alfons offering to resign from the presidency.

Amid concerns of a lack of trust and confidence in Hörmann's leadership and the DOSB during the COVID-19 pandemic, Hörmann resigned the presidency of the DOSB in June 2021 ahead of a vote of confidence.

In July 2021, during the 2020 Tokyo Games, German cyclist coach Patrick Moster made a racist remark on film about North African cyclists for which he was sent back to Germany. Moster issued a public apology, and Hörmann commented on it to say that he believed that the apology was sincere. Hörmann was also criticized because of this event for the working environment of the DOSB as a result.

Personal life
Hörmann is married and has three children.

References 

1960 births
Germany at the Olympics
Living people
Olympic officials
People from Kempten im Allgäu